The 1997 Daytona 500, the 39th running of the event, was held on February 16 at Daytona International Speedway in Daytona Beach, Florida. Consisted of 200 laps and 500 miles, it was the first race of the 1997 Winston Cup season. Mike Skinner, driving the #31 car for Richard Childress Racing, won the pole and Jeff Gordon, driving the #24 Chevrolet for Hendrick Motorsports, won the race. The race was broadcast on television by CBS. This would be the last Daytona 500 attempt for Delma Cowart.

Background

Daytona International Speedway is a race track in Daytona Beach, Florida that is one of six superspeedways to hold NASCAR races, the others being Michigan International Speedway, Auto Club Speedway, Indianapolis Motor Speedway, Pocono Raceway and Talladega Superspeedway. The track also features two other layouts that utilize portions of the primary high speed tri-oval, such as a  sports car course and a  motorcycle course. The track's  infield includes the  Lake Lloyd, which has hosted powerboat racing. The speedway is owned and operated by International Speedway Corporation.

The track was built by NASCAR founder Bill France, Sr. to host racing that was being held at the former Daytona Beach Road Course and opened with the first Daytona 500 in 1959. The speedway has been renovated three times, with the infield renovated in 2004, and the track repaved in 1978 and 2010.

The Daytona 500 is regarded as the most important and prestigious race on the NASCAR calendar. It is also the series' first race of the year; this phenomenon is virtually unique in sports, which tend to have championships or other major events at the end of the season rather than the start. Since 1995, U.S. television ratings for the Daytona 500 have been the highest for any auto race of the year, surpassing the traditional leader, the Indianapolis 500 which in turn greatly surpasses the Daytona 500 in in-track attendance and international viewing. The 2006 Daytona 500 attracted the sixth largest average live global TV audience of any sporting event that year with 20 million viewers.

Race recap

Notes 
Joe Nemechek's car owner Felix Sabates bought the #73 entry of Phil Barkdoll, who had qualified 38th. Nemechek went to the #73 for the 500.
Remington Arms placed their sponsor logos on the #19 Ford driven by Loy Allen Jr. for Tri-Star Motorsports after Rick Mast failed to qualify the RahMoc car.
Robert Pressley's car caught air after he spun on lap 10. The rear of the car lifted so much, the car was temporarily sliding across the track on its nose. The landing was quite hard, so after the crew repaired the car, then Busch Series competitor and future 2-time Camping World Truck Series Champion Todd Bodine hopped in to complete more laps.
Dale Earnhardt was involved in a crash in a six-way battle for the lead with 12 laps to go, in which his #3 Chevrolet scraped the backstretch wall by itself, then made contact with Dale Jarrett causing Earnhardt's car to roll over.  While his car was on its roof, Earnhardt was contacted by Ernie Irvan in the #28 Ford. The hood of Irvan's car detached and sailed into the backstretch grandstand, injuring a few spectators.  Earnhardt famously noticed that his tires were still on the car after the crash, had his car taken off the hook, and drove it back to pit road. The car was repaired and Earnhardt was able to return to the race, 5 laps down in 31st.
The race ended under caution after the Big One occurred on lap 196, involving 13 cars.
 Hendrick Motorsports posted a 1-2-3 finish with Gordon winning the race, Terry Labonte finishing second, and Ricky Craven finishing third.  The team used a formation finish as the race ended under the safety car, which was possible at the time.
At age 25, Jeff Gordon became the youngest Daytona 500 winner ever. Richard Petty had previously been the youngest winner in 1964, when he won the 500 at age 26. Gordon's record was surpassed when Trevor Bayne won the 2011 Daytona 500 at age 20.

Results

References

Daytona 500
Daytona 500
NASCAR races at Daytona International Speedway